Morrell Park is the name of at least two neighborhoods in the United States:

Morrell Park, Baltimore

and

Morrell Park, Philadelphia, Pennsylvania